Cerebral folate deficiency is a condition in which concentrations of 5-methyltetrahydrofolate are low in the brain as measured in the cerebral spinal fluid despite being normal in the blood. Symptoms typically appear at about 5 to 24 months of age. Without treatment there may be poor muscle tone, trouble with coordination, trouble talking, and seizures.

One cause of cerebral folate deficiency is a mutation in a gene responsible for folate transport, specifically FOLR1. This is inherited in an autosomal recessive manner. Other causes appear to be Kearns–Sayre syndrome and autoantibodies to the folate receptor.

For people with the FOLR1 mutation, even when the systemic deficiency is corrected by folate, the cerebral deficiency remains and must be treated with folinic acid. Success depends on early initiation of treatment and treatment for a long period of time. Fewer than 20 people with the FOLR1 defect have been described in the medical literature.

Signs and symptoms

Children with the FOLR1 mutation are born healthy. Symptoms typically appear at about 5 to 24 months of age. The symptoms get worse with time. Without treatment there may be poor muscle tone, trouble with coordination, trouble talking, and seizures. In addition, signs of psychomotor retardation, sleep disturbances, cerebellar ataxia, and delayed development of head growth can occur. At around age three, visual disturbances can develop, and sensorineural hearing loss can occur at around age six. In children with cerebral folate deficiency, the cerebrospinal fluid shows low levels of 5MTHF, and a loss of white matter in the brain (leukodystrophy) may occur. As a result of the decreased levels of 5MTHF, the child experiences low levels of Vitamin B folate.  There is inability for the 5MTHF to be transported across the blood-brain barrier, resulting in symptoms of seizures, delayed cognitive and motor processing, and autistic features.

Causes
One cause of cerebral folate deficiency is due to a genetic mutation in the FOLR1 gene. It is inherited in an autosomal recessive manner. The mutation of the FOLR1 gene causes an inability to produce the FRA protein. More commonly, CFD involves the malfunction and disruption of the folate receptor alpha (FRA). One way the FRA can be disrupted is by the attachment of the autoantibodies, causing dysfunction in the receptor. Also, a mitochondrial disease can impact the functioning of the folate receptor alpha. In order for the receptor to function properly, energy from the mitochondria is required. Folate must be actively transported into the brain, so ATP from the mitochondria is essential. If the individual has a mitochondrial disease, the FRA could be lacking adequate energy, resulting in the deficiency of folate in the brain.

Other causes appear to be Kearns–Sayre syndrome and autoantibodies to the folate receptor. Furthermore, secondary cerebral folate deficiency can develop in patients with other conditions. For example, it can develop in AADC deficiency through the depletion of methyl donors, such as SAM and 5-MTHF, by O-methylation of the excessive amounts of L-dopa present in patients.

Treatment
For people with the FOLR1 mutation, even when the systemic deficiency is corrected by folate, the cerebral deficiency remains, and must be treated with folinic acid. Folinic acid is a metabolically active form of folate that can be easily introduced into the folate cycle. A typical dose that is administered to children is 0.5–1 mg/kg daily, but the dose can be increased depending on the severity of symptoms and the age of the child. Over time, the treatment with folinic acid has shown to reduce a variety of symptoms of CFD. The treatment of folinic acid can lead to improvements in walking, speech, interpersonal skills and reduction in seizures. Success depends on early initiation of treatment. Starting the folinic acid treatment before the age of six is more advantageous for the child with CFD. If the treatment is started after the age of six, its results are not as effective. Treatment requires taking folinic acid for a significant period of time. Fewer than 20 people with the FOLR1 defect have been described in the medical literature. Treatment with pharmacologic doses of folinic acid has also led to reversal of some symptoms in children diagnosed with cerebral folate deficiency and testing positive for autoantibodies to folate receptor alpha.

Figures

See also
 Hereditary folate malabsorption
 5,10-methenyltetrahydrofolate synthetase deficiency - microcephaly, short stature, developmental delay, hypomyelination
 Folate deficiency

External links
 Cerebral Folate Deficiency - description (2019) on the website of the National Organization for Rare Disorders (NORD).
 Neurodegeneration due to cerebral folate transport deficiency - description in the OMIM, a catalog of genetically-linked disorders.

References

Brain disorders